Fire Chasers is a 2017 English-language original Netflix documentary series produced by Leonardo DiCaprio and directed by Julian T Pinder, showing the dangers of firefighting by exploring the 2016 California fire season.

Premise
Fire Chasers shows the dangers the firefighting men and women face when combating flames using on-helmet cameras and intimate firefighting footage, exploring the 2016 California fire season.

Episodes

Release
It was released on September 8, 2017, on Netflix streaming.

References

External links
 
 
 

2010s American documentary television series
2017 American television series debuts
English-language Netflix original programming
Netflix original documentary television series
Television series about firefighting
Works about wildfires